The South African Medical Association (SAMA) is a non-statutory, professional association for public- and private-sector medical practitioners in South Africa. Registered as a non-profit organisation it acts as a trade union for its public-sector members. It is affiliated with the Congress of South African Trade Unions (COSATU).

Membership is voluntary, with some 70% of doctors in South Africa currently registered as members. The head office is situated in Pretoria, South Africa.

History
On 21 May 1998, the association was established from a merger between the Medical Association of South Africa, founded in 1927, and the Progressive Doctors' Group.

In 1999, it became affiliated with the National Medical Alliance, along with the South African Medical and Dental Practitioners, Society of Dispensing Family Practitioners, Family Practitioners Association, Dispensing Family Practitioners Association, and the Eastern Cape Medical Guild.

In 2022 its chairwoman, Dr Angelique Coetzee, stated in a radio interview that admission processes at medical schools are highly politicized, and that medical faculties implement race quotas. After she apologized for her statements and resigned as chairwoman, Dirk Hermann of Solidarity reiterated that race-based admission processes were explicitly included in admission policies, and stated that these were detrimental to white students and health care.

Business focus
Activities focus on the professional and business aspects of medical practice.

Mission
SAMA's mission statement is: "Empowering doctors to bring health to the nation."

Values:
 Learning and adapting.
 Building trust relationships.
 Valuing diversity.

References

External links
 SAMA – Official website

Congress of South African Trade Unions
Healthcare trade unions in South Africa
Trade unions in South Africa